Svitlana Bevza is a Ukrainian fashion designer. She is the founder and creative director of BEVZA.

Biography
Svitlana Bevza was born in Kyiv. She graduated from Kyiv National University of Trade and Economics and Kyiv National University of Technologies and Design.

In May 2013, Svitlana won the nomination "Best Designer of Women's Clothing" of the Best Fashion Awards.

In 2014, BEVZA became the first Ukrainian brand to reach the finals of Vogue Talents in Milan.

References

Year of birth missing (living people)
Living people
Ukrainian fashion designers
Ukrainian women fashion designers